William Hopkins Holyland (1807-1882) was an English accountant. He is best known for having co-founded, with  Samuel Lowell Price and Edwin Waterhouse, the accountancy practice of Price Waterhouse that now forms part of PricewaterhouseCoopers.

Career
He first joined the firm of Coleman, Turquand, Youngs & Co. where he became an expert in liquidations and bankruptcies. He became friends with another clerk by the name of Edwin Waterhouse while working there. In 1865, he went into partnership with Samuel Lowell Price and then persuaded Price to recruit Waterhouse into the practice that is now famous.

Holyland retired in 1871.

He died 20 January 1882 at Hatch Gate, Horley, Sussex.

References

1807 births
1882 deaths
British accountants
PricewaterhouseCoopers
19th-century British businesspeople